The 1932 New Mexico A&M Aggies football team was an American football team that represented New Mexico College of Agriculture and Mechanical Arts (now known as New Mexico State University) as a member of the Border Conference during the 1932 college football season.  In its fourth year under head coach Jerry Hines, the team compiled a 4–5–1 record (1–2–1 against conference opponents), finished fifth in the conference, and outscored opponents by a total of 252 to 88.

Schedule

References

New Mexico AandM
New Mexico State Aggies football seasons
New Mexico AandM Aggies football